Henry Bolte (born August 4, 2003) is an American baseball outfielder in the Oakland Athletics organization.

Early life and amateur career
Bolte lives in Palo Alto, California and attended Palo Alto High School. During the 2021 season, he hit .304 with five doubles, six triples, and three home runs. In the following summer he played in the Area Code Games. As a senior, Bolte batted .441 with 45 hits, 13 home runs, and 42 RBIs. Following the end of the season, he participated in the Major League Baseball draft combine. Bolte committed to play college baseball at Texas, but turned down the scholarship offer to sign with the A's.

Professional career
The Oakland Athletics selected Bolte 56th overall in the 2022 Major League Baseball draft. He signed with the team on July 25, 2022, and received a $2 million signing bonus. After signing, Bolte was assigned to the Rookie-level Arizona Complex League Athletics to begin his professional career.

References

External links

Living people
2003 births
Baseball outfielders
Baseball players from California
Arizona Complex League Athletics players
Palo Alto High School alumni